Lovelife is a 1997 romantic comedy film written and directed by Jon Harmon Feldman. The ensemble cast includes Matt Letscher, Sherilyn Fenn, Saffron Burrows, Carla Gugino, Bruce Davison, Jon Tenney and Peter Krause.

Lovelife was nominated for a Feature Film Award at the 1997 Austin Film Festival, and won an Audience Award at the Los Angeles Independent Film Festival. The film was winner of the screenplay award at the L.A. Indie fest.

External links

 

Lovelife review at Variety.com
Lovelife review at Qwipster.net
Lovelife review at Cybergraffiti

1997 films
1997 romantic comedy-drama films
American independent films
American romantic comedy-drama films
1997 independent films
1990s English-language films
1990s American films